Coleophora thymiphaga is a moth of the family Coleophoridae.

References

thymiphaga
Moths described in 1989